Uptar is an urban locality (an urban-type settlement) under the administrative jurisdiction of the Town of Magadan in Magadan Oblast, Russia. Population:

References

Urban-type settlements in Magadan Oblast